Route 62 is a  state highway in the U.S. state of New Jersey. It begins at the centerline of U.S. Route 46 (US 46) along Union Boulevard (Passaic County Route 646) in the community of Totowa and continues northward to the merge of the Interstate 80 (I-80) westbound off-ramp at Exit 55B, where Route 62 ends. The route continues as Passaic County Route 646 in both directions, heading northbound to Paterson and southbound to Little Falls.

Route 62 was originally an alignment of Route S6, which was designated in 1929. The route went from the Caldwells in Essex County to the West Paterson corporate line. Route S6 was decommissioned in the 1953 renumbering and replaced with Route 62, which went from Totowa to West Paterson until being truncated to its current length.

Route description

Route 62 begins at an intersection with the off-ramp from US 46 eastbound and Passaic County Route 646 in the community of Totowa. The highway heads northward along Union Boulevard, intersecting with the on-ramp from Route 62 to US 46 eastbound. The route heads across a long bridge over the eastbound and westbound divided lanes of US 46. After crossing the bridge, Route 62 heads into a small industrial part of Totowa, where it intersects with the off-ramp from the westbound lanes of US 46. The highway continues northward, intersecting with Furler Street and Lackawanna Avenue with jughandles in the northeastern quadrant. Route 62 continues along Union Boulevard, becoming a divided highway. The highway crosses over a Norfolk Southern railroad line before meeting I-80 at interchange 55A, where the route's designation terminates. The route continues into Paterson as County Route 646.

History

Route 62 was the original route of pre-1927 Route 12, and later of Route 6 (the predecessor of Route 46), designated 1927. When in 1929 Route 6 was redefined to bypass Paterson to the south, State Highway Route S6 was also designated to take on its old route west of Paterson. Before the bypass of Paterson was completed in 1943, U.S. Route 46 followed Route S6 into the city, following the old Route 6 alignment of McBride Avenue, Spruce Street, and Market Street to its current alignment. In the 1953 New Jersey state highway renumbering on January 1, 1953, Route S6 was renumbered to Route 62. Route 62 remained along this alignment before being truncated by 1980. Route 62 was left out of the Straight Line Diagrams produced by the New Jersey Department of Transportation in 2000, but was returned the next year. Route 62 received improvements of the interchange with US 46 in 2006 at a cost of $22.748 million (2006 USD) to repair the bridge over US 46, ramp reconfigurations and new resurfaced roadway.

Major intersections

See also

References

External links

062
Transportation in Passaic County, New Jersey
State highways in the United States shorter than one mile